The Iowa Hawkeyes men's soccer team represented the State University of Iowa (now University of Iowa) in college soccer competitions from 1872 until 1892. The team won unofficial pre-regulation national titles in 1884, 1886 and 1888 per ASHA/IFRA. While there was no formal way to gauge a national champion, ASHA and IFRA crowned Iowa's teams during the 1880s as national champions by de facto by having the best record among organized college soccer teams that played friendly matches against other schools.

The first known soccer team to represent the university was in 1872 and the final known team played in 1888. The school has had a club team presence since then, but no varsity team.

Seasons

See also 
 1883–84 Iowa Hawkeyes men's soccer team

References 

 
Defunct soccer clubs in Iowa
1872 establishments in Iowa
1888 disestablishments in Iowa
Association football clubs disestablished in 1888
Association football clubs established in 1872